Magnolia Heights School is a private school in Senatobia, Mississippi. The school was established in 1970 as a segregation academy.

Foundations
Magnolia Heights School was founded by Nat G. Troutt, encouraged by a group of citizens who felt the need for alternative education in the Tate county area. In the school's first session in 1970–71, 233 students attended with the first senior class graduating fifteen students on the front campus of the school.  School enrollment in the 2015-16 year was 628. In grades 1-12, 5 of 584, or less than 1%, of students were black.

The school was part of a wave of segregation academies that opened after the court ordered desegregation of Mississippi public schools.

Academics
In 2017, the school claimed a 100% graduation rate, with 100% offered scholarships.

Notable alumni
Cameron Lawrence, former NFL player
  Addison Lawrence (American Football), Former NFL Player

References

Educational institutions established in 1970
Private elementary schools in Mississippi
Private high schools in Mississippi
Schools in Tate County, Mississippi
Private middle schools in Mississippi
Preparatory schools in Mississippi
Segregation academies in Mississippi